The LU postcode area, also known as the Luton postcode area, is a group of seven postcode districts in England, within three post towns. These cover south Bedfordshire (including Luton, Dunstable and Leighton Buzzard), plus small parts of north Hertfordshire and east Buckinghamshire.



Coverage
The approximate coverage of the postcode districts:

|-
! LU1
| LUTON
| Luton (South), Aley Green, Caddington, Lower Woodside, Pepperstock, Slip End, Woodside
| Luton, Central Bedfordshire
|-
! LU2
| LUTON
| Luton (East), Chiltern Green, Cockernhoe, East Hyde, Lawrence End, Lilley, New Mill End, Peters Green, Tea Green, The Hyde, Wandon End, Wandon Green, Winch Hill, London Luton Airport
| Luton, Central Bedfordshire, North Hertfordshire
|-
! LU3
| LUTON
| Luton (North), Lower Sundon, Streatley, Sundon
| Luton, Central Bedfordshire
|-
! LU4
| LUTON
| Luton (West), Chalton, London Farm, Bedfordshire
| Luton, Central Bedfordshire
|-
! LU5
| DUNSTABLE
| Dunstable (East including Woodside Estate), Bidwell, Chalgrave, Fancott, Harlington, Houghton Regis (including Townsend Industrial Estate), Thorn, Toddington
| Central Bedfordshire
|-
! LU6
| DUNSTABLE
| Dunstable (West), Eaton Bray, Edlesborough, Holywell, Kensworth, Northall, Sewell, Studham, Totternhoe, Whipsnade
| Central Bedfordshire, Buckinghamshire
|-
! LU7
| LEIGHTON BUZZARD
| Leighton Buzzard, Bragenham, Briggington, Burcott, Cheddington, Chelmscote, Clipstone, Crafton, Cublington, Eggington, Great Billington, Grove, Heath and Reach, Hockliffe, Horton, Hollingdon, Ivinghoe, Ivinghoe Aston, Ledburn, Leedon, Little Billington, Mentmore, Pitstone, Slapton, Soulbury, Stanbridge, Stewkley, Stockgrove, Tebworth, Tilsworth, Wing, Wingfield
| Central Bedfordshire, Buckinghamshire
|}

Map

See also
Postcode Address File
List of postcode areas in the United Kingdom

References

External links
Royal Mail's Postcode Address File
A quick introduction to Royal Mail's Postcode Address File (PAF)

Luton
Postcode areas covering the East of England